Veley is a surname. Notable people with the surname include:

Alex Veley (born 1973), American musician, keyboardist, and singer
Charles Veley, American traveler and businessman
 Lilian J. Veley, better known as Lilian Jane Gould (1861–1936), British biologist
Margaret Veley (1843–1887), English poet and writer